Cham Anjir (also Romanized as Cham Anjīr) is a village in Kakavand-e Gharbi Rural District, Kakavand District, Delfan County, Lorestan Province, Iran. At the 2006 census, its population was 105, in 20 families.

References 

Towns and villages in Delfan County